Brunon Bendig (6 October 1938 – 15 September 2006) was a Polish amateur boxer who won a silver medal in the featherweight division at the 1965 European Championships. He competed in the 1960 and 1964 Olympics in bantamweight and won a bronze medal in 1960, losing in the semifinal to the eventual winner Oleg Grigoryev. In 1964 he was eliminated in the second bout.

1964 Olympic results
Below is the record of Brunon Bendig, a Polish bantamweight boxer who competed at the 1964 Tokyo Olympics:

 Round of 32: defeated Rainer Poser (Unified Team of Germany) by decision, 3-2
 Round of 16: lost to Karimu Young (Nigeria) by decision, 2-3

References

1938 births
2006 deaths
People from Chełmno
Olympic boxers of Poland
Bantamweight boxers
Olympic bronze medalists for Poland
Boxers at the 1960 Summer Olympics
Boxers at the 1964 Summer Olympics
Olympic medalists in boxing
Sportspeople from Kuyavian-Pomeranian Voivodeship
Polish male boxers
Medalists at the 1960 Summer Olympics